Bartholomew of Farne (died 1193) was a Benedictine hermit. Born Tostig, to parents of Scandinavian origin, in Whitby, England, he changed his name to William while still a child. He then travelled through Europe, possibly to escape marriage. He returned to England to enter the Benedictine monastery at Durham. It was here that he received a vision of Saint Cuthbert, and then decided to inhabit Cuthbert's old cell on one of the Farne Islands. There he remained for the remaining 42 years of his life.

References

English Roman Catholic saints
12th-century Christian saints
1193 deaths
English Benedictines
Year of birth unknown